Psychology and Aging is a monthly peer-reviewed scientific journal published by the American Psychological Association. The current editor-in-chief is Elizabeth L. Stine-Morrow (University of Illinois at Urbana-Champaign). It covers research on adult development and aging whether applied, biobehavioral, clinical, educational, experimental (laboratory, field, or naturalistic studies), methodological, or psychosocial.

The journal has implemented the Transparency and Openness Promotion (TOP) Guidelines.  The TOP Guidelines provide structure to research planning and reporting and aim to make research more transparent, accessible, and reproducible.

Abstracting and Indexing 
The journal is abstracted and indexed by MEDLINE/PubMed and the Social Sciences Citation Index. According to the Journal Citation Reports, the journal has a 2020 impact factor of 3.34.

References

External links 
 

Quarterly journals
English-language journals
Gerontology journals
American Psychological Association academic journals
Publications established in 1986
Developmental psychology journals